Louise Mary Page (7 March 1955 – 30 May 2020) was a British playwright.

Life
Page was born on 7 March 1955 in London.

Page studied at University College Cardiff (now Cardiff University) and at the University of Birmingham. She was commissioned by the Birmingham Arts Lab, and was Yorkshire Television Fellow at Sheffield University. She was Royal literary Fellow at Leeds Trinity University 2003–04, Edge Hill University, and the Huddersfield University, 2007–2009.

Page was the first Fellow to be placed at the University of Huddersfield; she made a significant contribution to the academic development of many students, particularly in health and social care education, drawing on her personal experience of health and ill-health

Page's legacy was a well-established fellowship which has been continuous since. During her time at Huddersfield her play Salonika was produced at the Leeds Playhouse and she led a creative writing masterclass at the Huddersfield Literary Festival in 2008.

After Huddersfield she continued to collaborate with the Fellowship coordinator there to produce a Reflective Practice textbook, using a creative, narrative style.

With her husband, Christopher Hawes, Page ran Words4work.

Page died of cancer on 30 May 2020, aged 65.

Awards

 1977 International Student Playscript Award for Lucy.
 1982 George Devine Award, for Salonika.
 1985 J.T. Grein Award

Works
Glasshouse, Edinburgh, 1977
Want-Ad, Birmingham Rep, Birmingham, 1977
Tissue, Belgrade Theatre, Coventry, 1978
Hearing, Birmingham Rep, Birmingham, 1979
Lucy, Old Vic, Bristol, 1979
Flaws, Sheffield University Drama Studio, Sheffield, 1980
House Wives, Derby, 1981
Salonika, Royal Court Theatre Upstairs, London, 1982
Falkland Sound/Voces De Malvinas, Royal Court Theatre, London, 1983
Golden Girls Other Place, Stratford-upon-Avon, 1984
Real Estate, Tricycle Theatre, London, 1984
Beauty and the Beards, Old Vic Theatre, London, 1985
Beauty And The Beast, Playhouse, Liverpool, 1985
Goat, Croydon, 1986
Diplomatic Wives, Watford Place Theatre, Hertford, 1989
Adam Was A Gardener, Minerva Theatre, Chichester, 1991
Hawks And Doves, Nuffield Theatre, Southampton, 1992
Spare Parts, Studio Theatre, Sacramento, 1992
Like To Live, New York, 1992
Another Nine Months, New End Theatre, London, 1995
''The Statue Of Liberty, Playhouse, Derby, 1997

References

1955 births
2020 deaths
Writers from London
Alumni of the University of Birmingham
Alumni of the University of Wales
British dramatists and playwrights